The Bobcat Fire was a fire that started on September 6, 2020, as part of the 2020 California wildfire season. By December 18, it was fully contained and had burned  in the central San Gabriel Mountains, in and around the Angeles National Forest. It is one of the largest fires on record in Los Angeles County to date.

Details 
The fire triggered mandatory evacuation orders in parts of Arcadia and Camp Williams. The cause of as of November 8, 2020, was still under investigation, but it was thought to be due to power line conductor torching overhead trees. Southern California Edison disclosed that "power circuits had a momentary interruption (“a relay operation”) minutes after the Bobcat Fire was discovered by cameras positioned on nearby mountain peaks."

The fire initially spread southward which prompted evacuation orders for residents in Sierra Madre, Monrovia, Bradbury, and Duarte, along with evacuation warnings for those in Arcadia, Pasadena, and Altadena. The fire then grew westward and threatened the Mount Wilson Observatory by September 15, approaching within  of the observatory as firefighters worked to protect the structure. By September 17, the fire rapidly expanded to the north into Pleasant View Ridge Wilderness due to moderate coastal winds, leading to mandatory evacuations in Antelope Valley as the fire approached Juniper Hills. Containment difficulties were exacerbated by very dry vegetation and rugged topography that made it difficult to access.

An estimated 6,000 structures were threatened and there were 6 injuries. It damaged 28 residences and destroyed 27. It also damaged 19 other structures and destroyed 83. 240 personnel were deployed.

Along with the El Dorado Fire, the fire contributed to hazardous air pollution in the Los Angeles region.

Aftermath 
The blaze burned over 180 square miles (460 square kilometers); this makes it the second-largest wildfire recorded in modern times in Los Angeles County, behind the 2009 Station Fire and surpassing the 1970 Clampitt Fire. The air quality was bad in the burned areas and in LA basin for weeks as a result.

In the San Gabriel Mountains, several types of wildlife and aquatic creatures such as fish, frogs and western pond turtles face extinction as a result of the fires. The area of Little Rock Creek contains much of these aquatic life. Biologists and wildlife organizations were considering rescue operations.

After the fires, some home owners were having trouble finding home insurance as some insurers pulled out of certain zip codes or even certain counties. Most remaining insurers have raised prices. The CA State Department of Insurance banned insurers from cancelling insurance policies or declining renewals for one year after the fires.

Gallery

References

2020 California wildfires
Angeles National Forest
September 2020 events in the United States
Wildfires in Los Angeles County, California